Kanavan Manaivi is a 1976 Indian Tamil-language romantic drama film directed by A. Bhimsingh and written by Kalaignanam. The film stars R. Muthuraman and Jayalalithaa, with K. A. Thangavelu, Sachu, Srikanth Suruli Rajan and V. S. Raghavan in supporting roles. It was released on 23 January 1976. The film was remade in Telugu as Sita Ramulu (1980) and in Hindi as Haisiyat (1984).

Plot 

Chithra, a wealthy girl, falls in love with Shankar, an ordinary man. However, things change when she learns that Shankar is an employee in her company. When Shankar finds the truth he denies her proposal because of their status barrier, but Chitra solves the puzzle by assuring that they will play the dual role as a worker and a proprietor in the factory and at home as a beloved wife and husband.

Cast 
 R. Muthuraman as Shankar
 Jayalalithaa as Chithra
 Srikanth as Ravi
 K. A. Thangavelu as Chithra's uncle/Ravi's father
 V. S. Raghavan as Inspector Ramadurai
 Suruli Rajan as Gopal
 Sachu as Usha
 Sukumari as Ranganayaki
 Usilaimani as Gopal

Soundtrack 
Th emusic was composed by V. Kumar with lyrics by Kannadasan and Vaali.

Reception 
Kanthan of Kalki praised Bhimsingh's direction and writing.

References

External links 

1970s Tamil-language films
1976 films
Films about poverty in India
Films directed by A. Bhimsingh
Films scored by V. Kumar
Indian black-and-white films
Indian romantic drama films
Indian satirical films
Tamil films remade in other languages